Fosterella villosula is a plant species in the genus Fosterella. This species is endemic to Bolivia.

References

villosula
Flora of Bolivia